Lloyd Snow (born January 5, 1943) is an educator and former political figure in Newfoundland and Labrador, Canada. He represented Trinity-Bay de Verde in the Newfoundland and Labrador House of Assembly from 1989 to 2003 as a Liberal.

He was born in Victoria, the son of Arthur Snow, and was educated in Brownsdale and at Memorial University. Snow was an elementary school principal and high school teacher and vice-principal. In 1967, he married Linda Mansfield. Snow was mayor of Hant's Harbour. He served as speaker for the provincial assembly from 1995 to 2003.

References 
 

Speakers of the Newfoundland and Labrador House of Assembly
Liberal Party of Newfoundland and Labrador MHAs
Mayors of places in Newfoundland and Labrador
1943 births
Living people
21st-century Canadian politicians